Jeremiah Clemens (December 28, 1814 – May 21, 1865) was a U.S. senator and novelist from the state of Alabama. He was elected to fill the vacancy left by the death of Dixon Hall Lewis, and served from November 30, 1849, to March 3, 1853. Clemens was the author of Tobias Wilson, one of the first American Civil War novels, and he was also one of the earliest writers of Western novels.

Biography
Clemens was born in Huntsville, Alabama on December 28, 1814, son of James Clemens, a merchant who had emigrated to Alabama with his wife Minerva (Mills) Clemens from Pennsylvania by way of Kentucky shortly before their son's birth. Clemens was well educated for his time, attending the former LaGrange College in Leighton, Alabama and the University of Alabama before studying law at Transylvania University. He began the practice of law in Huntsville in 1834 and was appointed the Attorney General for the Northern District of Alabama in 1838. He served one term (1839–1841) in the Alabama House of Representatives. He served in the U.S. Army during the Mexican War and was eventually promoted to Colonel in the United States volunteers for his service.

When Dixon Hall Lewis died from complications related to his morbid obesity Clemens was elected by the Alabama legislature to complete his term as United States Senator from Alabama, serving from November 30, 1849, to March 1853. After his term he relocated to Memphis, Tennessee due to business interests, particularly his co-ownership of a newspaper, The Memphis Eagle and Enquirer, which he also edited.

Though a Democrat Clemens was a staunch Unionist in his political views who argued that talk of secession should be postponed until such time as Abraham Lincoln mentioned emancipating the slaves (a position whose practitioners were known as "wait and seers" in the pre-war South). Clemens served as the representative from Madison County, Alabama to the Alabama Secession Convention where he and his like minded "wait and seers" were outvoted in a landslide by advocates of secession. Because of his military experience and rank he was commissioned Major General of the Army of Alabama soon after the inauguration of Jefferson Davis, a position replaced by a generalship in the Confederate Army upon its creation, but in 1862 he resigned his commission altogether due to his political opposition to the war for secession. He did not serve in the Union Army against Alabama, but he made no secret of his pro-Union views and wrote to various members of the Lincoln administration and the United States War Department advising them on how best to mollify the South peaceably and how to deal with Reconstruction upon the Confederacy's inevitable defeat. His death from natural causes on May 21, 1865, came too soon for him to take an active role in the reconciliation of the nation.

Novels
Clemens was most famous outside of Alabama during his lifetime as a novelist. Bernard Lyle (Philadelphia, 1853) and Mustang Grey (1857) were at least partly autobiographical novels set in the Texas War of Independence and the Mexican–American War and both received critical acclaim at the time of their release. The Rivals (1859) was a novelization of the enmity between Aaron Burr and Alexander Hamilton. His final novel, Tobias Wilson, published posthumously in 1865, was an account of Unionist partisans who fought during the Civil War in the mountains of Alabama near Clemens' hometown of Huntsville. He was engaged in the preparation of a history of the war, giving an insight into the character, causes, and conduct of the war in northern Alabama, but it was left unfinished at his death.

Family
Jeremiah Clemens was a distant cousin of Samuel Langhorne Clemens, better known as Mark Twain.

References

Attribution

External links

 
 Jeremiah Clemens at Encyclopedia of Alabama

1814 births
1865 deaths
Politicians from Huntsville, Alabama
Writers from Huntsville, Alabama
American people of English descent
Democratic Party United States senators from Alabama
Democratic Party members of the Alabama House of Representatives
Alabama Secession Delegates of 1861
United States Attorneys for the Northern District of Alabama
American male novelists
19th-century American novelists
19th-century American male writers
University of Alabama alumni
Transylvania University alumni
People of Alabama in the American Civil War
American military personnel of the Mexican–American War
United States Army colonels